Diethyl phthalate (DEP) is a phthalate ester. It occurs as a colourless liquid without significant odour but has a bitter, disagreeable taste. It is more dense than water and insoluble in water; hence, it sinks in water.

Synthesis and applications
Diethyl phthalate is produced by the reaction of ethanol with phthalic anhydride, in the presence of a strong acid catalyst:

It finds some use as a specialist plasticiser in PVC, it has also been used as a blender and fixative in perfume.

Biodegradation

Biodegradation by microorganisms
Biodegradation of DEP in soil occurs by sequential hydrolysis of the two diethyl chains of the phthalate to produce monoethyl phthalate, followed by phthalic acid. This reaction occurs very slowly in an abiotic environment. Thus there exists an alternative pathway of biodegradation which includes transesterification or demethylation by microorganisms, if the soil is also contaminated with methanol, that would produce another three intermediate compounds, ethyl methyl phthalate, dimethyl phthalate and monomethyl phthalate. This biodegradation has been observed in several soil bacteria. Some bacteria with these abilities have specific enzymes involved in the degradation of phthalic acid esters such as phthalate oxygenase, phthalate dioxygenase, phthalate dehydrogenase and phthalate decarboxylase.
The developed intermediates of the transesterification or demethylation, ethyl methyl phthalate and dimethyl phthalate, enhance the toxic effect and are able to disrupt the membrane of microorganisms.

Biodegradation by mammals
Recent studies show that DEP, a phthalic acid ester (PAE), is enzymatically hydrolyzed to its monoesters by pancreatic cholesterol esterase (CEase) in pigs and cows. These mammalian pancreatic CEases have been found to be nonspecific for degradation in relation to the diversity of the alkyl side chains of PAEs.

Toxicity
Little is known about the chronic toxicity of diethyl phthalate, but existing information suggests only a low toxic potential. Studies suggest that some phthalates affect male reproductive development via inhibition of androgen biosynthesis. In rats, for instance, repeated administration of DEP results in loss of germ cell populations in the testis. However, diethyl phthalate does not alter sexual differentiation in male rats. Dose response experiments in fiddler crabs have shown that seven-day exposure to diethyl phthalate at 50 mg/L significantly inhibited the activity of chitobiase in the epidermis and hepatopancreas. Chitobiase plays an important role in degradation of the old chitin exoskeleton during the pre-moult phase.

Teratogenicity

When pregnant rats were treated with diethyl phthalate, it became evident that certain doses caused skeletal malformations, whereas the untreated control group showed no resorptions. The amount of skeletal malformations was highest at highest dose. In a following study it was found that both phthalate diesters and their metabolic products were present in each of these compartments, suggesting that the toxicity in embryos and fetuses could be the result of a direct effect.

Future investigation

Some data suggest that exposure to multiple phthalates at low doses significantly increases the risk in a dose additive manner. Therefore, the risk from a mixture of phthalates or phthalates and other anti-androgens, may not be accurately assessed studying one chemical at a time.  The same may be said about risks from several exposure routes together. Humans are exposed to phthalates by multiple exposure routes (predominantly dermal), while toxicological testing is done via oral exposure.

References 

Ethyl esters
Phthalate esters
Endocrine disruptors